This list is complete and up-to-date as of December 31, 2014.
The following is a list of players, both past and current, who appeared at least in one game for the San Diego Padres National League franchise (1969–present).



Players in Bold are members of the National Baseball Hall of Fame.

Players in Italics have had their numbers retired by the team.

A

Shawn Abner
Ed Acosta
Mike Adams
Jon Adkins
Mike Aldrete
Manny Alexander
Eliézer Alfonzo
Dusty Allen
Carlos Almanzar
Bill Almon
Abraham Almonte
Roberto Alomar
Sandy Alomar Jr.
Yonder Alonso
Matty Alou
Gabe Alvarez
R. J. Alvarez
Alexi Amarista
Chip Ambres
Héctor Ambriz
Larry Andersen
Dwain Anderson
Matt Antonelli
José Arcia
Oswaldo Arcia
Alex Arias
George Arias
Steve Arlin
Mike Armstrong
Randy Asadoor
Andy Ashby
Tucker Ashford
Pedro Astacio
Carlos Asuaje
Rich Aurilia
Brad Ausmus
Erick Aybar
Oscar Azócar

B

Cha Seung Baek
Carlos Baerga
Chuck Baker
John Baker
Jack Baldschun
Josh Banks
Josh Bard
Josh Barfield
Kevin Barker
Clint Barmes
Marty Barrett
Michael Barrett
Jason Bartlett
Bob Barton
Anthony Bass
Randy Bass
Rich Batchelor
Buddy Baumann
Mike Baxter
Jason Bay
Trey Beamon
Bill Bean
Rod Beck
Glenn Beckert
Derek Bell
Heath Bell
Mark Bellhorn
Andy Benes
Gary Bennett
Joaquín Benoit
Sean Bergman
Victor Bernal
Andrés Berumen
Jim Beswick
Christian Bethancourt
Kurt Bevacqua
Dann Bilardello
Dennis Blair
Willie Blair
Henry Blanco
Kyle Blanks
Jabari Blash
Curt Blefary
Geoff Blum
Hiram Bocachica
Doug Bochtler
Bruce Bochy
Brian Boehringer
Ricky Bones
Juan Bonilla
Greg Booker
Bret Boone
Danny Boone
Rob Bowen
Brad Boxberger
Jason Boyd
Blaine Boyer
Brad Brach
Darren Bragg
Russell Branyan
Ángel Bravo
Dewon Brazelton
Craig Breslow
Colten Brewer
Dan Briggs
Doug Brocail
Jim Brower
Bobby Brown
Chris Brown
Emil Brown
Jarvis Brown
Kevin Brown
Ollie Brown
Jim Bruske
Brian Buchanan
Ryan Buchter
Billy Buckner
Al Bumbry
Chris Burke
Greg Burke
Cory Burns
Sean Burroughs
Terry Burrows
Randy Byers
Mike Bynum

C

Everth Cabrera
Trevor Cahill
Mike Caldwell
Kevin Cameron
Mike Cameron
Ken Caminiti
Dave Campbell
Mike Campbell
Leonel Campos
Chris Cannizzaro
Jorge Cantú
Carter Capps
Javier Cardona
Luke Carlin
Buddy Carlyle
Andrew Carpenter
Cesar Carrillo
Joe Carter
Dave Cash
Andrew Cashner
Jack Cassel
Scott Cassidy
Vinny Castilla
José Castillo
Tony Castillo
Andújar Cedeño
Ronny Cedeño
Jhoulys Chacín
Mike Champion
Floyd Chiffer
Archi Cianfrocco
Adam Cimber
Jeff Cirillo
Jack Clark
Jerald Clark
Jermaine Clark
Phil Clark
Tony Clark
Horace Clarke
Paul Clemens
Matt Clement
Pat Clements
Mike Colangelo
Nate Colbert
Dusty Coleman
Keith Comstock
Clay Condrey
Brooks Conrad
Scott Coolbaugh
Danny Coombs
Joey Cora
Franchy Cordero
Allen Córdoba
Bryan Corey
Mike Corkins
Pat Corrales
Kevin Correia
Jarred Cosart
John Costello
Mike Couchee
Callix Crabbe
César Crespo
Jake Cronenworth
Deivi Cruz
José Cruz Jr.
Will Cunnane
Aaron Cunningham
John Curtis
Jack Cust
Éric Cyr

D

John D'Acquisto
Chase d'Arnaud
Paul Dade
James Darnell
Mike Darr
Doug Dascenzo
Jerry DaVanon
Tom Davey
Ben Davis
Bill Davis
Bob Davis
Gerry Davis
John Davis
Mark Davis
Storm Davis
Willie Davis
Roger Deago
Tommy Dean
Cody Decker
Jaff Decker
Marty Decker
Samuel Deduno
Rob Deer
Kory DeHaan
Eulogio de la Cruz
Luis DeLeón
Chris Denorfia
Jim Deshaies
Odrisamer Despaigne
Matt DeWitt
Miguel Díaz
Alex Dickerson
Miguel Diloné
Glenn Dishman
Pat Dobson
José Domínguez
Brian Dorsett
Paul Doyle
Dave Dravecky
Tom Dukes
Mike Dunne
Mike Dupree
Luis Durango

E

Adam Eaton
David Eckstein
Jim Edmonds
Dave Edwards
Jon Edwards
Juan Eichelberger
Dave Eiland
Mike Ekstrom
Donnie Elliott
Randy Elliott
A. J. Ellis
Alan Embree
Todd Erdos
Robbie Erlin
Jake Esch
Shawn Estes
Mark Ettles
Barry Evans
Leon Everitt

F

Bill Fahey
Brian Falkenborg
Irving Falu
Paul Faries
Tony Fernández
Al Ferrara
Robert Fick
Jeremy Fikac
Rollie Fingers
Steve Finley
Mike Fiore
Steve Fireovid
John Flaherty
Tim Flannery
Bryce Florie
Cliff Floyd
Rich Folkers
Logan Forsythe
Alan Foster
Jeff Francoeur
Jay Franklin
Dave Freisleben
Christian Friedrich
Ernesto Frieri
Danny Frisella
Reymond Fuentes
Tito Fuentes
Jeff Fulchino

G

Rocky Gale
Sean Gallagher
Freddy Galvis
Oscar Gamble
Ron Gant
Frank Garcés
Carlos García
Greg Garcia
Jesse Garcia
Ralph Garcia
Jeff Gardner
Wes Gardner
Jon Garland
Steve Garvey
Rod Gaspar
Cito Gaston
Chad Gaudin
Josh Geer
Bob Geren
Rusty Gerhardt
Justin Germano
Jody Gerut
Brian Giles
Marcus Giles
Ed Giovanola
Joe Goddard
Jake Goebbert
Chris Gomez
Pat Gomez
Adrián González
Alberto González
Alex Gonzalez
Edgar Gonzalez
Enrique González
Fernando González
Tony González
Wiki González
Tom Gorman
Rich Gossage
Yasmani Grandal
Mark Grant
Gary Green
Khalil Greene
Brian Greer
Luke Gregerson
Bill Greif
Mike Griffin
Tom Griffin
Johnny Grubb
Javy Guerra
Tayron Guerrero
Ricky Gutiérrez
Domingo Guzmán
Freddy Guzmán
Jesús Guzmán
Doug Gwosdz
Chris Gwynn
Tony Gwynn
Tony Gwynn Jr.
Jedd Gyorko

H

Luther Hackman
Don Hahn
Jesse Hahn
Jerry Hairston Jr.
Scott Hairston
Joey Hamilton
Atlee Hammaker
Chris Hammond
Justin Hampson
Erik Hamren
Brad Hand
Dave Hansen
Aaron Harang
Larry Hardy
Mike Hargrove
Gene Harris
Greg A. Harris
Greg W. Harris
Andy Hawkins
Brad Hawpe
Dirk Hayhurst
Ray Hayward
Chase Headley
Austin Hedges
Rickey Henderson
George Hendrick
Clay Hensley
Ron Herbel
Matt Herges
Dustin Hermanson
Jeremy Hermida
Carlos Hernández
Enzo Hernández
Jeremy Hernandez
Ramón Hernández
Junior Herndon
Keith Hessler
Kevin Higgins
Shawn Hill
Dave Hilton
Alex Hinshaw
George Hinshaw
Sterling Hitchcock
Trevor Hoffman
Ray Holbert
Mike Holtz
Eric Hosmer
Ben Howard
Thomas Howard
Jack Howell
LaMarr Hoyt
Walt Hriniak
Trenidad Hubbard
Justin Huber
Orlando Hudson
Phil Hughes
Nick Hundley
Randy Hundley
Cedric Hunter
Steve Huntz
Bruce Hurst
Tim Hyers
Adam Hyzdu

I

Tadahito Iguchi
Dane Iorg
Mike Ivie

J

Damian Jackson
Danny Jackson
Darrin Jackson
Edwin Jackson
Jay Jackson
Roy Lee Jackson
Chris James
Travis Jankowski
Kevin Jarvis
Jon Jay
Stan Jefferson
Garry Jestadt
Johnny Jeter
D'Angelo Jiménez
Brett Jodie
Ben Johnson
Brian Johnson
Erik Johnson
Jerry Johnson
Jonathan Johnson
Mike Johnson
Rob Johnson
Jay Johnstone
Bobby J. Jones
Bobby M. Jones
Chris Jones
Jimmy Jones
Randy Jones
Ruppert Jones
Von Joshua
Wally Joyner

K

Sean Kazmar
Randy Keisler
Dick Kelley
Shawn Kelley
Casey Kelly
Van Kelly
Matt Kemp
Fred Kendall
Brett Kennedy
Ian Kennedy
Terry Kennedy
Jason Kershner
Mike Kilkenny
Craig Kimbrel
Dave Kingman
Gene Kingsale
Dennis Kinney
Ian Kinsler
Clay Kirby
Michael Kirkman
Patrick Kivlehan
Ryan Klesko
Jon Knott
Brandon Kolb
Mark Kotsay
Kevin Kouzmanoff
Marc Kroon
Bill Krueger
Chris Krug
John Kruk
Ted Kubiak
Fred Kuhaulua

L

Pete Laforest
Dinelson Lamet
Tom Lampkin
Rick Lancellotti
Jason Lane
Mark Langston
Ray Lankford
Jody Lansford
Dave LaPoint
Greg LaRocca
Mat Latos
Eric Lauer
Brian Lawrence
Bill Laxton
Tom Layne
Wade LeBlanc
Wilfredo Ledezma
David Lee
Derrek Lee
Leron Lee
Mark Lee
Zach Lee
Joe Lefebvre
Craig Lefferts
Dave Leiper
Justin Leone
Jim Lewis
Jim Leyritz
Sixto Lezcano
Frankie Libran
Derek Lilliquist
Scott Linebrink
John Littlefield
Scott Livingstone
Kyle Lloyd
José Lobatón
Walker Lockett
Keith Lockhart
Gene Locklear
Carlton Loewer
Mickey Lolich
Tim Lollar
Joey Long
Terrence Long
Arturo López
Luis Lopez
Raffy Lopez
Rodrigo López
Mark Loretta
Aaron Loup
Gary Lucas
Joey Lucchesi
Ryan Ludwick
Cory Luebke
David Lundquist
Jordan Lyles
Fred Lynn

M

John Mabry
Manny Machado
Drew Macias
Shane Mack
Greg Maddux
Mike Maddux
Dave Magadan
Kazuhisa Makita
Jerry Manuel
Nick Margevicius
Manuel Margot
Jason Marquis
Dave Marshall
Al Martin
Carmelo Martínez
José Martínez
Luis Martínez
Pedro A. Martínez
Don Mason
Roger Mason
Marcos Mateo
Phil Maton
Julius Matos
Gary Matthews Jr.
Mike Matthews
Brandon Maurer
Dave Maurer
Tim Mauser
Darrell May
Cameron Maybin
Cory Mazzoni
Jim McAndrew
Paul McAnulty
Al McBean
Billy McCool
Willie McCovey
Lance McCullers
Ray McDavid
Chuck McElroy
Kyle McGrath
Fred McGriff
Joe McIntosh
Marty McLeary
Kevin McReynolds
Brian Meadows
Tommy Medica
Francisco Mejía
Mark Melancon
José Meléndez
Luis Meléndez
Tim Melville
Donaldo Méndez
Paul Menhart
Cla Meredith
Lou Merloni
Butch Metzger
Dan Miceli
Jason Middlebrook
Will Middlebrooks
Miles Mikolas
Bob Miller
Eddie Miller
Doug Mirabelli
Bryan Mitchell
Kevin Mitchell
Sid Monge
Willie Montañez
John Montefusco
Steve Montgomery
Jerry Morales
Rich Morales
Keith Moreland
Edwin Moreno
José Moreno
Juan Moreno
Brandon Morrow
Colt Morton
Dustin Moseley
Jerry Moses
José Mota
James Mouton
Edward Mujica
Sean Mulligan
Jerry Mumphrey
Steve Mura
Dan Murphy
Heath Murray
Ivan Murrell
Joe Musgrove
Greg Myers
Randy Myers
Rodney Myers
Wil Myers
Brian Myrow

N

Xavier Nady
Charles Nagy
Josh Naylor
Blaine Neal
Rob Nelson
Pat Neshek
Graig Nettles
Phil Nevin
Marc Newfield
David Newhan
Kevin Nicholson
Doug Nickle
Joe Niekro
Melvin Nieves
Wil Nieves
Jacob Nix
Eric Nolte
Nick Noonan
Fred Norman
Bud Norris
Derek Norris
José Núñez
Jerry Nyman

O

Ross Ohlendorf
Miguel Ojeda
Miguel Olivo
Mike Oquist
Eddie Oropesa
Jesse Orosco
Jimmy Osting
Al Osuna
Antonio Osuna
Akinori Otsuka
Dillon Overton
Bob Owchinko
Eric Owens
Micah Owings
Chris Oxspring

P

Chris Paddack
Mike Pagliarulo
Vicente Palacios
Lowell Palmer
Matt Palmer
Mark Parent
Chan Ho Park
Andy Parrino
Bob Patterson
Eric Patterson
Scott Patterson
Troy Patton
Jay Payton
Jason Pearson
Jake Peavy
Alex Pelaez
Roberto Peña
Luis Perdomo
Óliver Pérez
Santiago Pérez
Broderick Perkins
Sam Perlozzo
Gaylord Perry
Roberto Petagine
Adam Peterson
Jace Peterson
Gary Pettis
Kyle Phillips
Mike Phillips
Tom Phoebus
Mike Piazza
Kevin Pickford
José Pirela
Joe Pittman
Phil Plantier
Johnny Podres
Drew Pomeranz
Aaron Poreda
Jim Presley
Brandon Puffer
Tim Pyznarski

Q

Kevin Quackenbush
Chad Qualls
Paul Quantrill
Carlos Quentin
Humberto Quintero

R

Doug Rader
Aaron Rakers
Alexei Ramírez
Mario Ramírez
Roberto Ramírez
Cesar Ramos
Joe Randa
Dennis Rasmussen
Eric Rasmussen
Colin Rea
Randy Ready
Chris Rearick
Frank Reberger
Tim Redding
Jody Reed
Steve Reed
Chad Reineke
Desi Relaford
Hunter Renfroe
Merv Rettenmund
Carlos Reyes
Dennys Reyes
Franmil Reyes
Don Reynolds
Ken Reynolds
Ronn Reynolds
Clayton Richard
Gene Richards
Adam Riggs
Royce Ring
Mike Rivera
René Rivera
Roberto Rivera
Rubén Rivera
Anthony Rizzo
Joe Roa
Donn Roach
Bip Roberts
Dave Roberts (P)
Dave Roberts (3B)
Dave Roberts (CF)
Dave Robinson
Kerry Robinson
Óscar Robles
Rafael Robles
Fernando Rodney
Aurelio Rodríguez
Eddy Rodríguez
Edwin Rodríguez
Luis Rodriguez
Rich Rodríguez
Roberto Rodríguez
Ron Roenicke
Mandy Romero
Vicente Romo
José Rondón
Adam Rosales
Steve Rosenberg
John Roskos
Dave Ross
Gary Ross
Tyson Ross
Jerry Royster
Sonny Ruberto
José Ruiz
Glendon Rusch
Adam Russell
Marc Rzepczynski

S

A. J. Sager
Luis Salazar
Oscar Salazar
Duaner Sánchez
Héctor Sánchez
Reggie Sanders
Scott Sanders
Benito Santiago
Al Santorini
Luis Sardiñas
Rick Sawyer
Pat Scanlon
Mark Schaeffer
Ryan Schimpf
Calvin Schiraldi
Don Schulze
John Scott
Tim Scott
Evan Scribner
Rudy Seánez
Todd Sears
Dick Selma
Frank Seminara
Dan Serafini
Wascar Serrano
Al Severinsen
Dick Sharon
Andy Sheets
Gary Sheffield
Darrell Sherman
James Shields
Jason Shiell
Craig Shipley
Bob Shirley
Eric Show
Terry Shumpert
Paul Siebert
Sonny Siebert
Candy Sierra
Brian Sikorski
Walter Silva
Steve Simpson
John Sipin
Tommie Sisk
Don Slaught
Terrmel Sledge
Ron Slocum
Heathcliff Slocumb
Burch Smith
Jake Smith
Ozzie Smith
Pete J. Smith
Seth Smith
Frank Snook
Yangervis Solarte
Alí Solís
Elías Sosa
Juan Soto
Cory Spangenberg
Josh Spence
Stan Spencer
Ed Spiezio
Dan Spillner
Ed Sprague
George Stablein
Larry Stahl
Matt Stairs
Craig Stammen
Fred Stanley
Craig Stansberry
Dave Staton
Tim Stauffer
Jim Steels
Phil Stephenson
Todd Steverson
Chris Stewart
Kurt Stillwell
Craig Stimac
Robert Stock
Bob Stoddard
Tim Stoddard
Ricky Stone
Matt Strahm
Brent Strom
Huston Street
Eric Stults
Champ Summers
Jeff Suppan
Gary Sutherland
Brian Sweeney
Mark Sweeney
Rick Sweet
Steve Swisher
Matt Szczur
Jason Szuminski

T

Jeff Tabaka
Dennis Tankersley
Fernando Tatís Jr.
Jim Tatum
Kerry Taylor
Ron Taylor
Miguel Tejada
Blake Tekotte
Tom Tellmann
Garry Templeton
Gene Tenace
Walt Terrell
Tim Teufel
Bob Tewksbury
Joe Thatcher
Dale Thayer
Matt Thornton
Derrel Thomas
Jason Thompson
Mike Thompson
Dickie Thon
Mark Thurmond
Ron Tingley
Bobby Tolan
Freddie Toliver
Brian Tollberg
Brett Tomko
Dave Tomlin
Yorvit Torrealba
Luis Torrens
Alex Torres
Héctor Torres
José Torres
Bubba Trammell
Rich Troedson
J. J. Trujillo
Jerry Turner

U

B. J. Upton
Justin Upton
Luis Urías
John Urrea

V

Ismael Valdez
José Valdez
Rafael Valdez
Wilson Valdez
Bobby Valentine
Fernando Valenzuela
Ben Van Ryn
John Vander Wal
César Vargas
Jim Vatcher
Greg Vaughn
Ramón Vázquez
Jorge Velandia
Guillermo Velasquez
Will Venable
Darío Veras
Quilvio Veras
Shane Victorino
Brandon Villafuerte
Carlos Villanueva
Christian Villanueva
Ron Villone
Nick Vincent
Joe Vitiello
Edinson Vólquez
Ed Vosberg

W

Kevin Walker
Pete Walker
Todd Walker
Donne Wall
Brett Wallace
Gene Walter
Dan Walters
Kevin Ward
Adam Warren
Mark Wasinger
Steve Watkins
Jered Weaver
Ryan Webb
Tyler Webb
Ray Webster
Jemile Weeks
Dave Wehrmeister
David Wells
Jared Wells
Kip Wells
Chris Welsh
Don Wengert
Andrew Werner
Matt Whisenant
Rondell White
Wally Whitehurst
Matt Whiteside
Ed Whitson
Rowan Wick
Brad Wieck
Joe Wieland
Alan Wiggins
Mark Wiley
Jim Wilhelm
Rick Wilkins
Bernie Williams
Brian Williams
Eddie Williams
George Williams
Jim Williams
Randy Williams
Woody Williams
Scott Williamson
Ron Willis
Earl Wilson
Josh Wilson
Dave Winfield
Trey Wingenter
Rick Wise
Jay Witasick
Kevin Witt
Ed Wojna
Randy Wolf
Travis Wood
Tim Worrell
Jaret Wright
Marvell Wynne

X

Y

Kirby Yates
Chris Young
Eric Young

Z
Lance Zawadzki

External links
BR batting statistics
BR pitching statistics

Major League Baseball all-time rosters
 
Roster